Center Stage: Turn It Up is a 2008 dance drama film and a sequel to Center Stage (2000). The film was directed by Steven Jacobson and written by Karen Bloch Morse. The film debut on Oxygen on November 1, 2008.

It stars Rachele Brooke Smith as Kate Parker and Kenny Wormald as Tommy Anderson, and also features Sarah Jayne Jensen as Suzanne Von Stroh, with Peter Gallagher and Ethan Stiefel returning from the first film as Jonathan Reeves and Cooper Nielson, respectively.

The film was followed by a sequel Center Stage: On Pointe (2016).

Plot
Kate Parker is saying goodbye to her friends in Detroit, Michigan and her little sister Bella because she is leaving home to go to an audition for the greatest dance school in America, the American Ballet Academy. Kate doesn't make it and instead of her Suzanne Von Stroh is chosen, because of an argument between the director of the school, Jonathan and one of the teachers, Cooper Nielson, who has returned to ABA after his ballet company lost its funding. A young dancer, Tommy Anderson, is stunned by Kate and is sure that she passed and got into the academy, but soon he discovers that she was rejected, and he is paired up with Suzanne instead. Kate, homeless in New York City, goes to a club called The Foundry where she finds Tommy and impresses both him and the owner of the club, Sal, who is Tommy's best friend, with her dance moves and energy. She is given a job at the club and sleeps in the upstairs office. Because she needs to find an apartment she agrees to help Tommy with his dance if he pays her.

Soon they start the classes, she finds an apartment, Tommy becomes a great student and is given the opportunity to dance with Suzanne for the famous choreographer Monica Straus. Meanwhile, Tommy and Kate begin to have feelings for each other and become a couple. They break up after Kate sees Tommy dance with Suzanne, for a gala, and at the end of the dance Suzanne kisses him. The next day Tommy finds Bella waiting for her at ABA and takes her to Kate. She then confesses to her sister that she was not accepted into the school. Kate decides to give up on dancing and go home to Detroit with Bella.

The next morning while waiting for the bus, Bella shows Kate a leaflet Tommy gave her, advertising an audition for "The Glass Slipper", a Broadway ballet version of Cinderella that Monica Strauss is casting. Kate decides to give her dancing dream one last shot. Kate gets into a final audition with two other girls, Suzanne being one of them, and three boys, including Tommy. Monica Strauss asks Tommy to dance with Suzanne, but he rejects her and offers the dance to Kate instead. Tommy receives the part of Prince and Kate of Cinderella.

Cast
 Rachele Brooke Smith as Kate Parker
 Kenny Wormald as Tommy Anderson
 Sarah Jayne Jensen as Suzanne Von Stroh
 Nicole Muñoz as Bella Parker
 Christopher Russell as Sal
 Peter Gallagher as Jonathan Reeves
 Ethan Stiefel as Cooper Nielson
 Christian Vincent as Harris
 Daniela Dib as Allison
 Crystal Lowe as Lexi
 Lucia Walters as Monica Strauss
 Harry Shum Jr. as Club Dancer

Production
The film was shot in Vancouver, BC, Canada.

Release
Center Stage: Turn It Up was first broadcast in the United States on November 1, 2008, on the Oxygen Network. The DVD was released in January 2009 by Sony Pictures Home Entertainment.

Soundtrack
 Raising the Barre – Medusa
 Balloon – Sara Haze
 Give It All I've Got – Bekki Friesen
 Turn Around – Soul P
 Burnin' – Ms. Triniti
 I Ain't Goin' Nowhere – Soul P
 Num Num – The DNC
 You Should Be Gone – Christelle Radomsky
 Loosen Up – Golden ft. Sophia Shorai
 Mista Ambarosia – The Spectaculars
 Don't Sweat – Ms. Triniti
 Street Ballet – Medusa
 Paper Plane – Lucy Schwartz
 A Part in That Show – Chris Joss
 Act Like You Want It – X5 ft. Mr. Fang
 Inside Outside – Miss Eighty 6
 Swing Baby Swing – The DNC
 Nobody Hot as Me – KU
 Rainmaker – Sara Haze
 Ten Things to Prove – Amali Ward
 You Belong – The Skies Of America
 24 – Jem

References

External links
 
 

2008 television films
2008 films
2000s teen drama films
2000s musical drama films
American coming-of-age drama films
American dance films
American musical drama films
American teen drama films
Direct-to-video sequel films
Films about ballet
2000s hip hop films
Films set in Detroit
Films set in New York City
Films produced by Laurence Mark
Stage 6 Films films
2008 directorial debut films
2008 drama films
American drama television films
2008 direct-to-video films
2000s American films